Röthenbach an der Pegnitz is a town in the district of Nürnberger Land, in Bavaria, Germany. It is situated on the Pegnitz River, 4 km southwest of Lauf an der Pegnitz, and 12 km east of Nuremberg (centre).

Notable people
 Sercan Sararer (born 1989 in Nürnberg), football player, grew up in Röthenbach

References

Nürnberger Land